The Taichung Time Square CBD is a skyscraper office building located on 213 Chaofu Road, Xitun District, Taichung, Taiwan. Construction of the building started in 2013 and it was completed in 2015. The building is 22nd tallest building in Taichung. The building is similar in appearance to Sompo Japan Building.

Location
The building is located in Taichung's 7th Redevelopment Zone, which is central business district of Taichung and houses many tourist attractions, such as Huilai Monument Archaeology Park and National Taichung Theater.

Design
Due to height restriction in the area, the volume of the building gradually retreats to form a setback, which forms a terrace space. The building and the terrace overlap to the roof garden, forming a forest in the sky. The terrace space is surrounded by green trees with vertical glass grids, allowing this green forest glass box to be integrated with the exterior of the building, which presents a novel look in the exterior design.

See also 
 List of tallest buildings in Asia
 List of tallest buildings in Taiwan
 List of tallest buildings in Taichung

References

2015 establishments in Taiwan
Skyscraper office buildings in Taichung
Office buildings completed in 2015